The Cabinet of the governor of Arkansas is a body of the most senior appointed officials of the executive branch of the government of Arkansas. Cabinet officers are appointed by the governor. Once confirmed, all members of the Cabinet receive the title "Secretary" and serve at the pleasure of the governor. The Cabinet is responsible for advising the governor on the operations and policies of the state government department under their purview.

History
The cabinet system was created by Governor Asa Hutchinson. The Transformation and Efficiencies Act of 2019 was his signature piece of legislation, consolidating 40 state government departments into 15, with each headed by a cabinet secretary. Arkansas state government had been last reorganized in 1971.

Current cabinet members

The current Cabinet is as follows:

Though the Arkansas Department of Transportation (ArDOT) is a similarly-named agency, the ArDOT director reports to the Arkansas State Highway Commission, and is independent of the governor.

See also
Government of Arkansas
Cabinet of the United States
List of Arkansas state agencies

Notes

United States state cabinets